"Fly to the Angels" is a power ballad by American glam metal band Slaughter.

Charts

References

1990 singles
1990 songs
Slaughter (band) songs
Chrysalis Records singles
Glam metal ballads